Zapolyarny (masculine), Zapolyarnaya (feminine), or Zapolyarnoye (neuter) may refer to:
Zapolyarny District, a district of Nenets Autonomous Okrug, Russia
Zapolyarny Urban Settlement, several municipal urban settlements in Russia
Zapolyarny (inhabited locality) (Zapolyarnaya, Zapolyarnoye), several inhabited localities in Russia